Marek Trval (born 14 August 1967) is a retired Czech football midfielder.

References

1967 births
Living people
Czech footballers
MFK Vítkovice players
AC Sparta Prague players
FK Viktoria Žižkov players
AFK Atlantic Lázně Bohdaneč players
SK Dynamo České Budějovice players
SK Spolana Neratovice players
FC DAC 1904 Dunajská Streda players
Czechoslovak First League players
Czech First League players
Association football midfielders
Czech expatriate footballers
Expatriate footballers in Slovakia
Czech expatriate sportspeople in Slovakia